The Birmingham Classic (currently sponsored by Rothesay Pensions) is a 250-level women's tennis tournament on the WTA Tour held at the Edgbaston Priory Club in Edgbaston, Birmingham, United Kingdom. Held at this location since 1982, the tournament is played on outdoor grass courts. It is seen as a warm up tournament for Wimbledon and a sister tournament to the men's Queen's Club Championships. Prior to 2014, the event was part of the WTA's International series. Between 2014 and 2019, it was a premier level tournament. The 2020 competition was cancelled due to the COVID-19 pandemic.

Sponsorship of the tournament has changed through the years, with the current sponsored name being the "Rothesay Classic". Previously, the event has been called the "Viking Classic", "Nature Valley Classic", "Aegon Birmingham Classic", the "DFS Classic", the "Dow Classic", and the "Edgbaston Cup."

Pam Shriver holds the record for the most singles titles with four (1984–1987 consecutively).

Past finals

Singles

Champions by country

Doubles

Champions by country

See also
 Birmingham Open – men's tournament

External links
Official website

 
Grass court tennis tournaments
WTA Tour
Tennis tournaments in England
Sport in Birmingham, West Midlands
Recurring sporting events established in 1982
1982 establishments in England